Mount Humphrey Lloyd is a conspicuous mountain,  high, which forms a substantial part of the divide between the heads of Towles Glacier and Manhaul Glacier, in the Admiralty Mountains of Victoria Land, Antarctica. It was discovered in 1841 by Sir James Clark Ross. He named this feature for the Rev. Dr. Humphrey Lloyd of Trinity College, Dublin, an active member of the British Association which promoted interest in magnetic and meteorological research in the Antarctic.

References

Mountains of Victoria Land
Borchgrevink Coast